Bhajpa Ki Baat is a predominantly Indian political news website and magazine. It is the official magazine of the Bharatiya Janata Party, Haryana.
 Its first edition was published dated on 1 October 2000 from state unit office under the editorial board of Rattan Lal Kataria, Manohar Lal Khattar & O. P. Dhankar. Pawan Pandit is currently serving as the editor-in-chief from 2020.

First editorial board

See also

Kamal Sandesh, a Hindi-language magazine published in Delhi
Bharatiya Janata Party, The parent political party 
Bharatiya Janata Yuva Morcha, The youth wing of the BJP

External links 
Bhajpa Ki Baat Official Website

References

Bharatiya Janata Party organisations
Bharatiya Janata Party
Political magazines published in India